Rødenessjøen is a lake in the municipalities of Aurskog-Høland in Akershus county and Marker in Østfold county, Norway.

See also
List of lakes in Norway

Aurskog-Høland
Marker, Norway
Lakes of Viken (county)